Bruno Neumann (26 April 1883 – 31 December 1943) was a German officer and horse rider who competed in the 1928 Summer Olympics.

In 1928 he and his horse Ilja won the bronze medal in the individual eventing competition. The German eventing team did not finish the team eventing competition, because only two riders were able to finish the individual competition.

References

External links
Bruno Neumann's profile at databaseOlympics
Bruno Neumann's profile at Sports Reference.com

1883 births
1943 deaths
German event riders
Olympic equestrians of Germany
German male equestrians
Equestrians at the 1928 Summer Olympics
Olympic bronze medalists for Germany
Olympic medalists in equestrian
Medalists at the 1928 Summer Olympics
German military personnel killed in World War II
Missing in action of World War II